Attention Span is a collaborative album by Bob Ostertag, Fred Frith and John Zorn, released in 1990 by RecRec Music.

Reception

Ted Mills of AllMusic said of Attention Span that it is "not as cohesive as some of his other, more conceptual works (sometimes you wonder if the whole thing is a favor to his fellow artists), but certainly not without worth."

Track listing

Personnel
Adapted from the Attention Span liner notes.

Musicians
 Fred Frith – guitar (1-26)
 Bob Ostertag – sampler, liner notes
 John Zorn – alto saxophone (1-26)

Production and design
 Bob Appel – engineering
 Douglas Kenny – cover art, design
 Jonathan Nelson – engineering
 Diego Zweifel – design

Release history

References

External links 
 Attention Span at Discogs (list of releases)

1990 albums
Bob Ostertag albums
RecRec Music albums
LGBT-related albums